The South American Youth Championship 1964 was held in Barranquilla, Bogotá, Cali and Medellín, Colombia.

Teams 
The following teams entered the tournament:

 
 
  (host)

Matches

External links 
 Results by RSSSF

South American Youth Championship
1964 in Colombian football
1964 in youth association football
International association football competitions hosted by Colombia